Zaklików  is a town in Poland, located in the Subcarpathian Voivodeship, in Stalowa Wola County (since 1999). For about 300 years of its early history Zaklików was incorporated as a city, but it lost its city charter in punishment for the January Uprising against the imperial rule. It was reinstated as a city on 1 January 2014.

It is located at an altitude of 593 feet (180 m). On the southside of Zaklików in the Subcarpathian Voivodeship the Pysznica Gmina is located. To the southwest is the town of Radomysl. The town is known for the production of sulfur; it also manufactures furniture and nuts & bolts.

History
Before the town existed, a Catholic parish was first established in Zdziechowice, a village  distance on September 22, 1409. The town of Zaklików was founded on April 9, 1565 by the royal assent obtained by the Castellan Stanisław Zakliko from the King Zygmunt August, on the lands previously belonging to the village of Zdziechowice. The founding charter was based on the Magdeburg Law. The city took its name along with the coat of arms from its founder. In 1787 Zaklików had 130 houses and 800 inhabitants. After the Third Partition of Poland in 1793 the city became part of the Austrian Partition ruled by Austria-Hungary. It became part of the Russian Empire (Congress Poland) in 1815 after the shifting of borders at the Congress of Vienna. 

Zaklików was controlled by the Lublin namestniks under the Russian Partition. The Jewish community was small. The Qahal had 192 members in 1790 at the time of the dismemberment of Poland. However, the Tsarist anti-Polish policies resulted in the rapid influx of refugees. By 1869 the number of inhabitants reached 2,080. In 1868 Joseph Lewinstein became the Rabbi of Zaklików, but he moved in 1875 to become rabbi of Serotzk in the governorate of Łomża. Zaklików remained in Russian hands until World War I. In 1914–15 the front passed through Zaklików three times. In the summer of 1915 the Russians were pushed out from Zaklików by the advance of the German and Austro-Hungarian armies. In November 1918, at the conclusion of war, Zaklikow again became part of sovereign Poland.

World War II
On September 13, 1939 the 14th army of the German Heeresgruppe Süd was advancing east and northwest in the course of Nazi-Soviet invasion of Poland. Enemy forces in front of the Korps divided into two parts: Northern & Southern. The northern part was withdrawing across the San River into the woods around Zaklikow and Biłgoraj, last time spotted on the Janów – Frampol road. On September 14, 1939 the Polish Armoured Train Nr. 51 ("Marszałek I"), while covering the retreat of Polish forces near the village of Zaklików, the train managed to delay the advance of the German 4th Infantry Division units until the next day and prevented the Polish 94th Inf. Rgt. from being cut off from the Polish main forces.

Sometime in 1942, 20 partisans led by Gregori Korchinski, most of them Jews fighting against the Nazis in Poland, moved to the Zaklików area and set up a partisan base in the village of Ludmilovka. They recruited additional 15 local men. Among the Jews, there were unified groups commanded by Yaacov Freitag and Reuven Pintel.

The Holocaust
Germans occupied Zaklikow in mid September 1939 and immediately burned down the Jewish residential area and forced the Jewish population to assemble, killing several at random. Afterwards, they robbed and plundered the Jewish community and conscripted many for forced labor. There was a small forced labor camp for Jews in the nearby village of Lysaków.

In 1941, Zakilow became a destination for Jews in surrounding areas who had been forced to leave their own towns by the Nazi SS and Police Chief of Lublin in cooperation with the "Sub-Department of Population and Welfare" of the Governor of the district of Lublin, on the proposal of the local authorities. Officer Lenk, a subordinate of the District Chief of Janów-Lubelski, wrote to the SS-and-Police-Chief of Lublin asking for deportation of local Jews to a different locations in Poland. Zaklikow was mentioned with 1,500 Jews to be "evacuated".

Around October 15, 1942, the SS and their Ukrainian auxiliaries and the local police gathered all Jews in the marketplace.  Hundreds, mostly children and the aged and ill, were murdered on the spot.  The rest were taken to Belzec where they were immediately murdered.  Two hundred or so had hidden from the roundup.  After this, those who hid reemerged and Jews from other towns were forcibly brought to the ghetto including  the entire Jewish population of the nearby town of Janów Lubelski, which included a few hundred Jews who had been deported there from Vienna in 1941.   Jews of Krasik were also brought to Zaklikow. According to testimony of Nuchim Rozenel, from the Jewish Historical Institute in Warsaw, on this month,  the Hassidic rabbi of Turobin was in the Kraśnik Ghetto together with his son and the son's family, and they were all deported to Zaklikow. 

On November 2 and 3, the 2000 Jews living in Zaklikow, including the rabbi and his family, were also sent to Belzec to be murdered. 
 
June 25, 1943: From the archives of the reports of the Argentinian diplomatic missions about the racist policies of Germany and the occupied European countries (1933–1945), on this date, Luis Luti, the Commercial Attaché of Argentina in Germany sent a letter to Argentina's Minister of Foreign Relations and Culture, Segundo R. Storni, in which he points out that "the road in which the deported Jews and the Jewish inhabitants of Poland were pushed to their ruin and destruction by the Nazis". In this report, he mentions the Warsaw Ghetto uprising and refers to the Treblinka concentration camp. The letter, numbered as "Note #275", and written in Berlin, states that after the violent dissolution of the Warsaw ghetto, in which the SS troops also suffered losses, according to the "Pat" agency, the Germans put great effort into "liquidating" the ghettos of the small cities in the provinces from which the Jews were deported. In this publication, the following cities are mentioned: Kraśnik, Zaklików, Lublin, Zawichost, Biała Podlaska, Jedresejow, Łuków, Sokołów, and Rawa Ruska.  

There were about 200 survivors among Zaklików's prewar population of 1400.  Most of the survivors had fled to the Soviet occupied territory at the beginning of the war or had escaped to the forest and fought as partisans. For a short description of the operation of the Zaklikow ghetto, see the Encyclopedia of Camps and Ghettos.

Post-war
Based on the 1989 population survey about the social stratification in Eastern Europe, Zaklików had a population of 8,877. According to the coding of geographical units based on the Wykaz symboli terytorialnych wojewodztw, gmin i miast (Register of Territorial Codes for Voivodeships, Counties and Cities) of the Warsaw Glowny Urzad Statystyczny (Central Statistical Office) of 1992, the code for Zaklikow is 83721 and it is considered a rural county. Abbreviations for GPS are: ZKL, ZKLKW, ZAKLKW. In 2000, The Levi-Strauss Foundation donated US$2,400 to the Dom Pomocy Spolecznej in Zaklików, to renovate a 24-hour care center for mentally disabled women.

Notable people
Joseph Lewinstein, rabbi of Zaklikow from 1868 to 1875.
Fr. Jerzy (George) Kusy, born April 12, 1960 in Janów Lubelski, attended high school in Zaklików, Poland. On October 8, 1999, Bishop Anthony Pilla appointed him associate pastor of The Shrine Church of St. Stanislaus in Cleveland, Ohio.
Julio Broner: born in Zaklikow, August 28, 1921. Emigrated to Argentina during World War II, the president of the CGE (Confederación General Económica, General Economic Confederation), a human rights activist.
Michael Kuperwasser, born in Zaklikow, November 13, 1920. Rose to the rank of 2nd Lieutenant of the 1st Polish Army of the East, 13th Motorized Artillery, receiving the Krzyz Walecznych medal of valour for heroic acts against the German enemy invader. After World War II, he moved to New York. Like his childhood friend Julio Broner he later moved to South America; and became the Financial Director of Copacabana Palace Hotel and Intercontinental Coffee Company in Rio de Janeiro, Brazil.
Samuel Klein (1923–2014), business magnate. Born in Zaklikow, after World War II he moved to São Paulo, Brazil, and founded the Casas Bahia chain of department stores in Brazil, building them into the top retailer in the country.

Historical figures
Zaklika of Miedzygorze, Chancellor of Poland some time in the 14th century.
Zaklika, who built hospitals in Queen Jadwiga's time.

References

Maps
Map of Zaklików with pictures of different streets

Photographs
  Photographs and general information about Zaklików
Photographs entitled: Muzeum – Zaklików
Ehemals Jüdische Straße in Zaklików
Photographs of Zaklików
Portrait of Danuta Schapira while in hiding on the Gotner farm in Zaklików

External links
Names of people from Zaklików who were in labor camps
Climate of Zaklików
Ryszard Polański, Historia Zaklikowa at Zaklikow.com

Further reading
 Joshua Laks ed. (1993), Hayiti sham (I was there), Bene Berak, 289 pages, University of Haifa, Haifa, Israel (in Hebrew), Call No: 0623544, Zalman Aranne Central Library, Beer Sheva, Israel, Call No: 1300530
 Joshua Laks, Zaklikow: A Small Town to Remember, English translation from Hebrew of Hayiti sham, published in Bnei Brak, Israel 1993.

Cities and towns in Podkarpackie Voivodeship
Stalowa Wola County
Holocaust locations in Poland